Matija Ivanić (also Matij Ivanić; Vrbanj, Hvar around 1445 – Rome 1523), was a prominent 16th century citizen of the Dalmatian city of Hvar who led the Hvar Rebellion (1510–1514) against the Venetian Republic. After the defeat of the Rebellion, Ivanić became a symbol of freedom in Venetian-controlled Dalmatia, personifying defiance both against Venice and against the oppressive noble classes. He was mentioned in the well-known Dalmatian song which expresses these themes, the "Padaj silo i nepravdo" ("Fall, oh Force and Injustice!"). The latest discoveries present Mati Ivanić as a true visionary who stepped ahead of his time and led the fight for the future that was just beginning to emerge during the Middle Ages.

See also
Hvar Rebellion
Hvar
Padaj silo i nepravdo

References

Croatian rebels
History of Dalmatia
Venetian Dalmatia
16th-century Croatian people
Year of birth uncertain
1523 deaths
People from Hvar
Venetian Slavs
15th-century Croatian military personnel
16th-century Croatian military personnel
History of Hvar